Aaro Jaskari (1 July 1880, Laihia - 28 July 1925) was a Finnish farmer and politician. He was a member of the Parliament of Finland from 1922 until his death in 1925, representing the National Progressive Party.

References

1880 births
1925 deaths
People from Laihia
People from Vaasa Province (Grand Duchy of Finland)
National Progressive Party (Finland) politicians
Members of the Parliament of Finland (1922–24)
Members of the Parliament of Finland (1924–27)